4 Train may refer to:
4 (New York City Subway service)
Yellow Line (Montreal Metro), formerly also known as Line 4
Paris Métro Line 4
Line 4 (Beijing Subway)
Line 4 (Shanghai Metro)

See also
Line 4 (disambiguation)